Streptomyces alkaliphilus is a bacterium species from the genus Streptomyces which has been isolated from sediments from the Lake Elmenteita from the Kenyan Rift Valley in Kenya.

See also 
 List of Streptomyces species

References

External links
Type strain of Streptomyces alkaliphilus at BacDive -  the Bacterial Diversity Metadatabase	

alkaliphilus
Bacteria described in 2015